The American International School of Costa Rica is an American international school in Cariari, La Asunción District, Belén, Heredia Province, Costa Rica. Serving grade levels preschool through 12, the school as of 2015 has 220 students. It was established in 1970.

See also

 Americans in Costa Rica
 Costa Rica–United States relations

References

External links
 American International School of Costa Rica
 American International School of Costa Rica 

American international schools in North America
International schools in Costa Rica
1970 establishments in Costa Rica
Educational institutions established in 1970